Mobi Fehr (born December 13, 1994 in New York City) is an American soccer player currently playing for USL Championship side Monterey Bay.

Playing career
Growing up in Japan, Fehr played in the Tokyo Verdy academy.

Fehr was on the roster of Major League Soccer club Portland Timbers during the 2013 season, but did not appear in a first-team game. In 2014, he moved to J3 League club SC Sagamihara.

Hoàng Anh Gia Lai
In November 2016, Fehr joined Vietnamese V.League 1 club Hoàng Anh Gia Lai on a one-year deal.

Monterey Bay FC
On February 14, 2022, Monterey Bay FC announced that they had signed Fehr ahead of their inaugural season. Fehr was included in the starting 11 for Monterey Bay's inaugural match, a 4-2 loss to Phoenix Rising FC. Fehr scored his first goal for Monterey Bay on May 21, 2022, the winner in a 2-0 victory over Louisville City FC.

Personal life
Fehr was born in New York City to a Swiss father and Japanese mother. He moved with his family to Tokyo in 2000.

Club statistics
Updated to 22 February 2016.

References

External links

1994 births
Living people
American soccer players
J3 League players
SC Sagamihara players
Portland Timbers players
Hoang Anh Gia Lai FC players
Las Vegas Lights FC players
Monterey Bay FC players
V.League 1 players
American expatriate soccer players
American expatriate sportspeople in Russia
Expatriate footballers in Russia
American expatriate sportspeople in Japan
Expatriate footballers in Japan
American expatriate sportspeople in Vietnam
Expatriate footballers in Vietnam
Association football defenders
Soccer players from New York City
American people of Swiss descent
American sportspeople of Japanese descent
American emigrants to Japan